Arya Surya is a 2013 Tamil comedy film directed by Rama Narayanan. The film stars Srinivasan and Vishnupriyan while Nakshatra, Kovai Sarala and Gangai Amaren play supportive roles.

Cast 
Srinivasan as Aryananda alias Arya
Vishnupriyan as Suryananda alias Surya
Nakshatra as Chandragaandha
Kovai Sarala as Chandralekha
Gangai Amaren as Kamalasekaran
Ganeshkar
Chitra Lakshmanan
Vennira Aadai Moorthy
Nalini
Special appearances in the song "Thagadu Thagadu"
T. Rajendar as himself
Mumaith Khan as an item number

Soundtrack 

The music was composed by Srikanth Deva. T. Rajendar sang the song Thagadu, Thagadu, in which he makes a cameo appearance.

Critical reception 
The Times of India rated the film 1 out of 5 stars saying that "The film feels like a bunch of arbitrary scenes strung together with a slender plot that is just an excuse to show us the antics of Power Star Srinivasan." Behindwoods wrote "Arya Surya could have made the cut if the director had made the happenings on screen more interesting and relatable to the current trend".

References

External links 

2013 films
2010s Tamil-language films
Indian comedy films
Films scored by Srikanth Deva
Films directed by Rama Narayanan
2013 comedy films